Silbersee is a lake in Langenhagen, Lower Saxony, Germany. 

Lakes of Lower Saxony